The 2019 Indian general election was held in Kerala on 23 April 2019 to constitute the 17th Lok Sabha.

Alliances and parties
The key alliances that fought for representation of Lok Sabha seats in Kerala are the UDF which is the Kerala state legislative alliance aligned with the UPA at the national level and the LDF comprising primarily the CPI(M) and the CPI.  National Democratic Alliance (NDA), which had not won any seat in the state, placed candidates in all constituencies. A new force in the election is the Left United Front.

United Democratic Front

Left Democratic Front

National Democratic Alliance

Parties not in any Coalition 

Aam Admi Party, who had contested in the 2014 elections decided not to contest this election so as to not split anti-BJP votes.

Opinion Polls

Seat Projection

Vote Percentage Prediction

Constituency Wise Prediction

Constituency-wise Candidates

Voter turnout

Bogus votes detection and re-polling
The Election Commission of India ordered to conduct re-polling on 19 May 2019 in 3 booths in Kasaragod and one in Kannur constituencies after confirming bogus votes.

Results

By party

By alliance

Constituency-wise Result

Constituency wise alliance votes

Assembly segments wise lead and votes secured by Parties

Results

Votes by State Legislative Assembly constituencies 
According to the ECI, the details of the valid votes polled in the state legislative assembly constituencies of Kerala are as follows:

See also 
 Elections in Kerala
 Politics of Kerala
 2020 Kerala local body elections

References

Notes

External links

 Election Commission of Kerala
Kerala lok sabha election 2019 date and schedule
2019 Lok Sabha Election Kerala State Constituencies Wise Results 

Indian general elections in Kerala
2010s in Kerala
2019 Indian general election by state or union territory